Fingerprints, released in 2006, is Peter Frampton's 13th studio album and first instrumental album, and features guest appearances from friends and musical acquaintances, as well as Frampton's signature effect, the talkbox. It was his first album on A&M Records in 24 years.

Fingerprints won a Grammy in 2007 for Best Pop Instrumental Album.

Track listing
All tracks composed by Peter Frampton and Gordon Kennedy; except where noted.
"Boot It Up" (Frampton, John Regan) (featuring Courtney Pine) - 3:27
"Ida y Vuelta (Out and Back)" (Frampton, Shawn Fichter, Stanley Sheldon) - 3:23
"Black Hole Sun" (Chris Cornell) - 5:25
"Float" - 4:03
"My Cup of Tea" (Hank Marvin, Brian Bennett, Gordon Kennedy, Frampton) - 4:52
"Shewango Way" - 3:19
"Blooze" (Frampton) - 5:14
"Cornerstones" (Charlie Watts, Bill Wyman, Chris Stainton, Frampton) - 3:13
"Grab a Chicken (Put It Back)" - 3:53
"Double Nickels" - 3:48
"Smoky" (Frampton) - 4:51
"Blowin' Smoke" (Matt Cameron, Mike McCready, Gary Westlake, Frampton) - 3:47
"Oh When..." (Frampton) - 1:19
"Souvenirs de Nos Pères (Memories of Our Fathers)" (John Jorgenson) - 4:56

Personnel 
 Peter Frampton - acoustic, electric and rhythm guitar, E-Bow
 Mike McCready - guitar 
 Gordon Kennedy - acoustic and electric guitar 
 Hank Marvin - electric guitar 
 Warren Haynes -  electric guitar 
 John Jorgenson - lead & rhythm guitar 
 Paul Franklin - pedal steel guitar
 John Regan - bass, double bass
 Stanley Sheldon - fretless bass
 Gary Westlake - bass
 Mark Griffiths - bass 
 Bill Wyman - bass on "Cornerstones"
 Charlie Chadwick - acoustic bass
 Arthur Stead - keyboards
 Blair Masters - keyboards, cello sample 
 Gustavo Ramirez - grand piano 
 Chris Stainton - grand piano, Hammond B-3 organ 
 Mark Harris - Hammond B-3 organ 
 John Burton - Pro-Tools 
 Courtney Pine - tenor saxophone 
 Chad Cromwell - drums
 Shawn Fichter - drums
 Matt Cameron - drums 
 Brian Bennett - drums 
 Charlie Watts - drums 
 Stephan Dudash - 5-string viola 
 Aaron Swihart - Internet Cooking Programs
 Daniel de los Reyes - percussion
 Gary L Cales II - DAW Chief Technical Engineer

References

 Personnel : https://www.discogs.com/fr/Peter-Frampton-Fingerprints/release/3520713

2006 albums
Peter Frampton albums
A&M Records albums
Grammy Award for Best Contemporary Instrumental Album
Albums produced by Peter Frampton